The Courage of Marge O'Doone is a 1920 American silent drama film directed by David Smith and featuring Pauline Starke, Billie Bennett, Niles Welch and Boris Karloff (as Buck Tavish, a mountain man). It was written by Robert N. Bradbury, based on the novel by James Oliver Curwood. The film is considered to be lost.

Plot
Michael O'Doone (George Stanley), his wife Margaret (Billie Bennett) and daughter Marge (Pauline Starke) are settlers living in the Northwest. While traveling on a winter day, Michael meets with an accident and never returns home. Thinking that her husband is dead, Margaret begins to lose her grip on sanity which enables Buck Tavish (Boris Karloff), a mountain man who always admired her, to abduct her and take her to his cabin. When she finally regains her senses, she departs on a search for Michael O'Doone, leaving her daughter Marge behind. At one point in the film, there is a scene where two large ferocious grizzly bears fight with each other, a highlight of the movie.

Years later, David Raine (Niles Welch) comes across a young girl's photograph and determines to find her. Soon after, he meets Rolland, a man who spends much of his life helping others. While searching in the wilderness, David finally finds the girl in the picture, who turns out to be  Marge O'Doone. He brings her to Rolland's cabin and there they discover to her surprise that Rolland is actually her missing father Michael O'Doone. Miraculously, the whole family is reunited when her mother Margaret is found soon after.

Cast
 Pauline Starke as Marge O'Doone
 Niles Welch as David Raine
 George Stanley as Michael O'Doone
 Jack Curtis as Brokaw
 William Dyer as Hauck
 Boris Karloff as Buck Tavish
 Billie Bennett as Margaret O'Doone
 James O'Neill as Jukoki
 Vincente Howard
 Jeanne Carpenter

See also 
 List of American films of 1920
 Boris Karloff filmography

References

External links 

 
 

1920 films
1920 drama films
American black-and-white films
Silent American drama films
American silent feature films
Lost American films
Northern (genre) films
1920 lost films
Lost drama films
Films based on novels by James Oliver Curwood
1920s American films